Ervin Mészáros (2 April 1877 – 21 May 1940) was a Hungarian fencer. He won a gold and a bronze medal at the 1912 Summer Olympics.

References

External links
 

1877 births
1940 deaths
Hungarian male sabre fencers
Olympic fencers of Hungary
Fencers at the 1912 Summer Olympics
Olympic gold medalists for Hungary
Olympic bronze medalists for Hungary
Martial artists from Budapest
Olympic medalists in fencing
Medalists at the 1912 Summer Olympics
20th-century Hungarian people
Sportspeople from the Austro-Hungarian Empire